Alec Stewart (born 1963) is a retired English cricketer.

Alec Stewart may also refer to:

Alec Stewart (Australian footballer) (1915–1976), Australian footballer for North Melbourne in the VFL
Alec Stewart (footballer, born 1868) (1868–?), Scottish association footballer
Alec Stewart (racehorse trainer) (1955–2004), Scottish racehorse trainer

See also
Alex Stewart (disambiguation)